Lord God bird may refer to one of two similar-looking large woodpeckers of North America:
The ivory-billed woodpecker, a rare bird believed to be critically endangered or extinct 
The pileated woodpecker, a common bird of North America

Lord God Bird may also refer to:
"Lord God Bird", a poem by Colin Cheney
"The Lord God Bird", 2005 song by Sufjan Stevens 
 The Lord God Bird, a 2007 documentary by filmmaker Robert Nixon

Animal common name disambiguation pages